Rüdersdorf is a municipality in the district Märkisch-Oderland, in Brandenburg, Germany, near Berlin.

It is served by the Schöneiche bei Berlin tramway which runs from Rüdersdorf through Schöneiche to Berlin-Friedrichshagen station on the Berlin S-Bahn network.  Bundesautobahn 10 passes through the town.

Overview
Rüdersdorf is noted for its open-cast limestone  mine. Today, some parts of the mine are used as a museum Museumspark Rüdersdorf. Notable buildings in Berlin such as the Brandenburg Gate and the Olympiastadium were built with limestone from Rüdersdorf.

Demography

Coat of arms 

The coat of arms of Gemeinde Rüdersdorf bei Berlin shows a rooted green lime tree with two red shields on its side. The shield towards the left of the trunk shows the silver hammer and pick as a symbol for the limestone quarrying: An industry which has shaped this municipality and is still present to this day. On the right side of the trunk, the shield symbolizes a silver turnip which represents the local agriculture. Both industries have been implanted back in the 13th century by the monks of the Zinna Abbey.

Notable people
Johanna Elberskirchen (1864-1943), activist
Andreas Thom (born 1965), footballer
Karla Woisnitza (born 1952), artist
Giacomo Meyerbeer (1791-1864), opera composer

Partnerships with other communes
Hemmoor in Lower Saxony, since 1991
Pierrefitte-sur-Seine in France, since 1966
Lomma Municipality in Sweden, since 2007
Popielów in Poland, since 1997

References

External links

Localities in Märkisch-Oderland